D415 branches off to the north from D414 in Donja Banda towards Trpanj ferry port - ferry access to Ploče on the mainland coast.

The road, as well as all other state roads in Croatia, is managed and maintained by Hrvatske ceste, state owned company.

Traffic volume 

Traffic is not regularly counted on the road, however, Hrvatske ceste report number of vehicles using Trpanj-Ploče ferry line, connecting D415 to the D413 state road. Furthermore the D415 road carries some local traffic on Pelješac peninsula itself, which does use the ferry at all, substantially exceeding the ferried traffic. Substantial variations between annual (AADT) and summer (ASDT) traffic volumes are attributed to the fact that the road connects to a number of summer resorts.

Road junctions and populated areas

Sources

State roads in Croatia
Transport in Dubrovnik-Neretva County